Brett McGavin (born 21 December 1999) is an English professional footballer who plays as a midfielder for Torquay United.

Club career

Ipswich Town
McGavin progressed through the Ipswich Town's youth system having joined the Ipswich Town academy in 2009. He signed his first professional contract with the club on 8 February 2019. Following short loan spells at Bury Town and Concord Rangers, he made his debut for the club on 12 November 2019, starting in an EFL Trophy group stage match against Colchester United. On 6 May 2020, Ipswich took up the option to extend McGavin's contract by a further year, keeping him at the club until 2021. McGavin made four appearances during the 2019–20 season. He signed a new contract with Ipswich on 9 September 2020, signing a two-year deal with the option of an additional year extension. At the end of the 2021–22 season, McGavin left the club having reached the end of his contract.

Ayr United (loan)
On 1 February 2021 McGavin joined Scottish side Ayr United on loan for the remainder of the 2020–21 season. On 5 February 2021, McGavin made his debut for the club, coming on as a second-half substitute in a 1-0 defeat to  Hearts.
In March 2021, McGavin's loan spell ended.

King's Lynn Town (loan)
In August 2021 McGavin signed on loan for King's Lynn Town for the 2021–22 season. He made his debut for King's Lynn on 28 August, coming on as a second-half substitute in a game against Yeovil Town.

Torquay United
In 2022 McGavin was released by Ipswich, and signed a three-year deal for Torquay United.

Personal life
Brett is the son of former professional footballer Steve McGavin.

Career statistics

References

External links

1999 births
Living people
Sportspeople from Bury St Edmunds
English footballers
Association football midfielders
Ipswich Town F.C. players
Bury Town F.C. players
Concord Rangers F.C. players
Ayr United F.C. players
King's Lynn Town F.C. players
Torquay United F.C. players
Isthmian League players
National League (English football) players